Italy participated at the 2017 Summer Universiade in Taipei, Taiwan.

With Naples being the host city of the 2019 Summer Universiade, an Italian segment will performed at the closing ceremony.

Medal summary

Medal by sports

Medalists

See also
Italy at the Universiade

References

External links
NUSF Overview - Italy
Medal Count 

Nations at the 2017 Summer Universiade
Summer U
Italy at the Summer Universiade